Dragon Dream (FAA registration: N866ML) is an experimental lighter than air (LTA) cargo rigid airship built by Worldwide Aeros Corp as a half-scale proof of concept prototype for a design which the manufacturer calls the "Aeroscraft". The development and design has been funded by the US government through the military Walrus HULA and then the  "Pelican" projects.

Design
The hull of the Dragon Dream has a flattened elliptic cross-section.

Buoyancy control is managed by pumping helium gas from the internal gas bag and compressing it into a storage cell, the reduction in lifting volume leading to a loss of buoyancy. The system can vary the airship's lift by 3,000–4,000 lb. The manufacturer uses the phrase "Control Of Static Heaviness" for this technology.

Specifications

Operational history
The airship was completed in 2013 and, after extensive systems tests in the construction hangar, was granted an airworthiness certificate by the US Federal Aviation Administration in September 2013, following which some outdoor tethered trials were carried out.  Shortly afterwards it was badly damaged when part of the hangar roof collapsed, and the company sued the US Navy for $65 million in 2015.

References

External links

Worldwide Aeros website

Airships of the United States
2010s United States experimental aircraft